Commander Harold Godfrey Lowe RD, RNR (21 November 1882 – 12 May 1944) was the fifth officer of the . He was amongst the 4 officers to survive the disaster.

Biography

Early years
Harold Lowe was born in Llanrhos, Caernarvonshire, Wales on 21 November 1882, the fourth of eight children, born to George and Harriet Lowe. His father had ambitions for him to be apprenticed to a successful Liverpool businessman, but Harold Lowe was determined to go to sea. At 14, he ran away from his home in Barmouth where he had attended school and joined the Merchant Navy, serving along the West African Coast. Lowe started as a ship's boy aboard the Welsh coastal schooners as he worked to attain his certifications. In 1906, he passed his certification and gained his second mate's certificate, then in 1908, he attained his first mate's certificate. By the time he started with the White Star Line, in 1911, he had gained his Master's certificate and, in his own words, "experience with pretty well every ship afloat – the different classes of ships afloat – from the schooner to the square-rigged sailing vessel, and from that to steamships, and of all sizes." He served as third officer on White Star's the Belgic and the Tropic before being transferred to Titanic as Fifth Officer in 1912. Despite his numerous years at sea, however, the maiden voyage of the Titanic was to be his first transatlantic crossing.

Aboard the Titanic
Like the ship's other junior officers, Lowe reported to White Star's Liverpool offices at nine o'clock in the morning on 26 March 1912, and travelled to board Titanic at Belfast the following day. On sailing day (10 April), Lowe assisted (among other things) in the lowering of two of the starboard lifeboats to satisfy the Board of Trade that Titanic met safety regulations. When Titanic departed Southampton at noon, Lowe was on the bridge, relaying messages to various parts of the ship by telephone. He claimed he felt like an outsider while aboard the Titanic as he had never worked with the other officers before and they had all travelled over the Atlantic before while he hadn't.

The sinking
On 14 April 1912, the night of the sinking, Lowe had been relieved at 8.00 PM by Sixth Officer Moody and was asleep in his quarters when the ship hit the iceberg at 11.40 PM. He remained asleep through the collision, but woke up 30 minutes later. As he explained later, "We officers do not have any too much sleep, and therefore when we sleep, we die." When Lowe finally awakened and realised the situation, he immediately got dressed and went to work; it isn't fully known when he got his pistol (described by Lowe as a "Browning Automatic"), it may have been as he was dressing or it may have been later during the 15 minutes his whereabouts were unknown, which may have been the time he went back to his room. Third Officer Pitman charged him with loading lifeboat No. 5. Around 1.30 AM, Lowe engaged in a conversation with Sixth Officer Moody: While launching lifeboats Nos. 14 and 16 on the port side of the ship, the two junior officers felt that this group of boats needed to have an officer with them. Moody insisted that Lowe should get onto lifeboat No. 14 and that he would get on another lifeboat. By the time lifeboat 14 was being launched, things were beginning to get precarious on the boat deck as the majority of passengers began to realise that the giant ship was foundering. As lifeboat 14 was descending, Lowe used his pistol to fire three shots along the side of the ship in order to frighten away a group of men attempting to leap into the lifeboat. During the Senate Inquiries, Lowe was emphatic in stating that he had not hit anyone, saying that he had looked where he was shooting. During the commotion Lowe was reported to have said ‘get back or I’ll shoot you all like dogs’ (which is said by Lightoller in the 1997 movie but whom eyewitnesses claim was Lowe). As of 2022, it remains definitively unknown who fired the shots.

When the ship foundered at around 2.20 AM, Lowe had begun to gather several lifeboats together. He wished to return to pick up survivors but had fears of being swamped by hordes of people due to the lack of experienced crewmen in the boats. He redistributed the survivors in the group of lifeboats he had gathered into a flotilla, in order to ready one lifeboat for a search for additional survivors. The lifeboat he took back to the site of the sinking had a hand-picked team of crewmen to assist in the rescue operation. They waited until the swimmers had thinned out before returning so that they would not be swamped and capsized by their numbers. It was only well-into the operation that they realised this had been unnecessary; the water being simply too cold for anyone to survive any great amount of time, let alone have the energy to swamp a lifeboat. In total there were four men taken out of the water, one of whom died later that night. Many more voices could be heard in the darkness, but locating them proved to be a largely fruitless task, despite the best efforts of the crew. Lowe's is noted as being one of only two lifeboats to return for survivors. An image taken by a passenger on the Carpathia clearly shows Lowe at the tiller of lifeboat 14 as they approach rescue. He remained aboard his lifeboat long enough to ship the mast and make certain everything was properly stowed.

Inquiries

The Titanic survivors arrived at Pier 54 in New York on 18 April. Immediately upon landing Lowe was served with a warrant which called upon him to testify in the American inquiry into the sinking. His testimony in the American Senate Hearing was direct, often to the point of being flippant; when asked what an iceberg was composed of, Lowe responded, "Ice, I suppose, sir." According to Titanic's Second Officer Charles Lightoller, the surviving officers considered the inquiry 'a farce' and were highly resentful owing to perceived poor treatment by the American authorities.  They were especially bemused that an enquiry into the sinking of a ship was being conducted by men with no knowledge of sailing, or the sea. Lowe boarded the Adriatic on 2 May to return to England, where he went on to participate in the corresponding British inquiry.

Later life
Upon his return to his home town of Barmouth 1,300 people attended a reception held in his honor at the Picture Pavilion. He was presented with a commemorative gold watch, with the inscription "Presented to Harold Godfrey Lowe, 5th officer R.M.S. Titanic by his friends in Barmouth and elsewhere in recognition and appreciation of his gallant services at the foundering of the Titanic 15th April 1912."

In September 1913, Harold married Ellen Marion Whitehouse, and they had two children, Florence Josephine who was born in 1914 and died in 1999 and Harold William who was born while Harold was serving in World War I. He served in the Royal Naval Reserve during the First World War and saw service in Vladivostok during the Russian Revolution and Civil War, attaining the rank of Lieutenant, RNR. After the war he returned to serve with International Mercantile Marine ships and the White Star Line, retiring in 1931 to Deganwy with his family.

During World War II he volunteered his home as a sector post and served as an Air Raid Warden until ill health obliged him to take to a wheelchair.

Death 
Lowe died of hypertension on 12 May 1944 at the age of 61. His body was buried at Llandrillo-yn-Rhos churchyard in Rhos-on-Sea in North Wales.

Legacy

In 1979's S. O. S. Titanic Lowe was played by Karl Howman. Lowe was portrayed by Welsh actor Ioan Gruffudd in the 1997 blockbuster movie Titanic. The film depicted Lowe rescuing first-class passenger Rose DeWitt Bukater (Kate Winslet) from the freezing ocean after she blows a whistle to get his attention. He was portrayed by Kavan Smith in the 1996 miniseries. He was played by Ifan Meredith in the 2012 TV miniseries Titanic.

Lowe is the subject of a biography by author Inger Sheil titled Titanic Valour: The Life of Fifth Officer Harold Lowe. In this biography, the author gathers multiple glowing references from both passengers and crew alike, many of whom credit him with having saved their lives. The author notes not just the volume of feeling shown towards Lowe by the people he helped, but also 'a surprising depth'. His strong leadership, organisational skills and encouragement was credited by numerous passengers as having been decisive in their survival; his actions on the night being described as 'exemplary'. Lowe later received multiple gifts and offers of money (which he always turned down) from grateful passengers, and would respond to such praise with the polite, but humble assertion that it was unnecessary as he had simply been doing his job. Survivor Renee Harris, writing in 1932, gave an interview in which she asserted that through all the years, Lowe had stood out in her memory as one of the finest men she had ever been privileged to meet.

A 2018 opinion piece in the Huffington Post titled "Here's Why You've Never Heard of the Titanic's Chinese Survivors", was less favourable to Lowe, who allegedly initially refused to save one man because he was a "Jap". The man, Fang Lang - who is actually supposed to have been one of the 8 Chinese on board the Titanic - was picked up from floating wreckage after passengers pressured Lowe. This oft-repeated allegation originates from a magazine article penned by 'eye-witness' Titanic passenger Charlotte Collyer in May 1912 and is almost certainly false. As Lowe's biographer Inger Shiel notes, Collyer was never in the rescue vessel, having been transferred to either boat 10, or 12 before it left Lowe's flotilla; a fact confirmed by several eyewitnesses, including two crew members and Collyer's own daughter. Supporting this are Collyer's further claims that the women in her lifeboat later had to row to the Carpathia once dawn arrived, which happened only to the occupants of boats 10 and 12. Rescue vessel 14 commanded by Lowe approached the Carpathia under sail, meaning Collyer could not have witnessed the events she described. Shiel also notes that Lowe was known to be respectful of the Chinese, and is reported to have risked his life to save a Chinese sailor from drowning during his early maritime career, diving into the water and keeping his Asian shipmate afloat, despite being on the ship's 'sick list' with blood poisoning at the time of the incident.

In 2004, a menu of the first meal ever served aboard Titanic, which Lowe had sent to his fiancée when the ship was docked in Ireland, sold for £51,000, breaking the record for auctioned Titanic memorabilia at that time.

A slate plaque in Lowe's memory was hung on the centennial anniversary of Titanic sinking in Barmouth, Gwynedd, Wales. Memorializing Lowe's service, the plaque is inscribed in both Welsh and English, with pictures of Lowe and Titanic. It reads:  "In Commemoration of local hero 5th Officer Harold Godfrey Lowe who left Barmouth aged 14 to go to sea. He played a heroic role in the rescue of survivors during the sinking of RMS Titanic on 15 April 1912." The plaque was unveiled by his grandson, Captain John Lowe and Maddy Matthews.

A small blue plaque, unveiled on 7 April 2012, marks Lowe's final home at 1, Marine Crescent in Deganwy, Conwy, where he lived until his death in 1944.

References

Bibliography
Sheil, Inger (2012), Titanic Valour: The Life of Fifth Officer Harold Lowe, The History Press,

External links
Titanic-Titanic entry
BBC Wales North West Public Life profile(Wayback Machine)
Encyclopedia Titanica  entry
Full American and British Inquiry Transcripts (partly retrieved from Wayback, last updated 2006, some corresponding links on page will not activate)
Welsh Mariners Index
5th officer Harold Lowe with two of his children

1882 births
1944 deaths
RMS Titanic's crew and passengers
British Merchant Navy officers
People from Caernarfonshire
Royal Navy officers of World War I
Deaths from hypertension
RMS Titanic survivors
Welsh sailors
Royal Naval Volunteer Reserve personnel of World War I
Civil Defence Service personnel
Royal Naval Reserve personnel